Frusta letteraria (The literary whip) was a fortnightly periodical founded in Venice in 1763, directed and written almost entirely by Giuseppe Baretti, under the pseudonym of Aristarchus Scannabue.

Published between 1763 and 1765, the magazine obtained a great success, especially for the polemical shots and the bright tones with which Baretti expressed his opinions towards numerous writers, his contemporaries or the past.

History 
During the years spent in England, Giuseppe Baretti had the opportunity to appreciate the liveliness of the English press. Back in Italy, he had decided to settle in Venice and to found a periodical on the model of "Tatler" and "Spectator". 

Baretti decided to sign the magazine under the pseudonym of Aristarco Scannabue, a character of his invention, to whom he dedicated a lively description in the introductory part. The figure he built, that of a former soldier who had fought for years in the East, was completely opposed to that of the eighteenth century academic scholar. Baretti imagined that Scannabue, after having retired to a country place, spent time reviewing, with strong criticism, all the books that were published and that were given to him by Don Pietro Zamberlucco, the parish priest of the place.

The first issue of the magazine came out on 1 October 1763 in Venice, but with the indication of Rovereto (a town located outside the borders of the Republic of Venice). The purpose of the founder was to avoid incurring the rigors of censorship. As for the title, the name "Frusta" (Whip) symbolizes the intentions of Baretti to whip metaphorically, through fierce criticism, all those who were considered by him as bad writers.

Baretti succeeded in gaining many readers, but at the same time there was no lack of controversy. At the beginning of 1765 the magazine came to the attention of the Reformers, the magistrature charged with monitoring the conformity of the printed works with the laws of the state. Numerous citizens, resentful of the criticisms made by Baretti against Pietro Bembo, a sixteenth-century poet, beloved by the Venetians, asked the Reformers to cease publication of the magazine. The magazine was not closed, but underwent strong censorship.

Baretti, who at first seemed to want to abandon the project, decided to move to another state. He began to print his periodical in Ancona, in the Papal States, starting from 1 April 1765. From then on, all the remaining eight issues of the magazine, from 19 April to 15 July 1765, were dedicated to the impetuous criticism against his father Appiano Buonafede, who a few months earlier had published a work, full of rancor against the Baretti, titled Novelle Menippe by Luciano Firenzuola against a certain pseudepigraphic Frusta by Aristarco Scannabue.

Bibliography 
 Giuseppe Baretti, La Frusta Letteraria, edited by Luigi Piccioni, Laterza, Bari 1932, voll. I and II
 Giuseppe Baretti, Opere Scelte, edited by Bruno Maier, UTET, Torino 1972, voll. I and II
 Giuseppe Baretti, La Frusta Letteraria, with a preface by Massimo Bontempelli, Istituto Editoriale Italiano, Milan 1910, voll. I and II
 Ferdinando Giannessi, La Frusta Letteraria, Typography Longo & Zoppelli, Treviso 1974.

References

Defunct literary magazines published in Italy
Italian-language magazines
Magazines established in 1763
Magazines disestablished in 1765
Mass media in Venice